Splashdown Quaywest is the largest outdoor waterpark in the UK. It is located on Goodrington Sands Beach near to Paignton, Devon.

The site has 8 water slides, small splash pools for youngsters and a swimming pool.  In addition to the water park, the site also hosts a beach shop and a restaurant called 'The View at Goodrington' and several food outlets selling fast food, ice creams and drinks.

History
The water park first opened in 1988 as Quaywest and it was run for 15 years by Freetime Lesiure Management.  Due to heavy financial losses Freetime Leisure Management handed the keys back to the council in September 2008.  Torbay council awarded the contract to run the park to Lemur Leisure Ltd, the company running the Splashdown water park in Poole, Dorset initially on a five and half year basis.  The park was re-opened in June 2009 as Splashdown@Quaywest and is now known as simply Splashdown Quaywest.

Gallery

References

Tourist attractions in Devon
Water parks in the United Kingdom
1988 establishments in England